Laura Wee Láy Láq (born 1952) is a Sto:lo artist known for her handbuilt ceramics work.

She studied fine arts at Douglas College from 1970 to 1973 and then ceramics at the Vancouver School of Art, graduating with an honors degree in 1977.

Career
Wee Láy Láq was part of the exhibition Border Zones: New Art Across Cultures at the University of British Columbia's Museum of Anthropology,  in parallel with the 2010 Winter Olympics.

Her work is included in the collections of the Vancouver Art Gallery, the Winnipeg Art Gallery, the Richmond Art Gallery in Richmond, British Columbia and the Museum of Anthropology at the University of British Columbia.

Wee Láy Láq is a recipient of the Fulmer Award in BC First Nations Art.

References

1952 births
20th-century Canadian artists
20th-century Canadian women artists
21st-century Canadian artists
21st-century Canadian women artists
Living people
First Nations women artists